The Sheenjek River is a  tributary of the Porcupine River in the U.S. state of Alaska. It begins in the eastern part of the Brooks Range and flows southward to meet the larger river northeast of Fort Yukon.

Its name derives from the Gwich'in word "khiinjik," meaning "dog-salmon river"." Explorer J.H. Turner called it the Salmon River.

In the United States, the geographic location most remote from human trails, roads, or settlements is found here, at the headwaters of the Sheenjek River.

Boating
The Sheenjek is suitable for boating by wide variety of watercraft between June and late September. The upper river is rated mostly Class II (medium) on the International Scale of River Difficulty, while the lower half of the river is Class I (easy). However, just after rainstorms, the river can suddenly rise and become more difficult.

Dangers on the upper river include shallow, extremely braided channels, and aufeis. Overhanging vegetation and submerged logs pose risks along the entire course, as do bears along the lower reaches in late summer and early fall.

See also
List of rivers of Alaska

References

Rivers of North Slope Borough, Alaska
Rivers of Alaska
Rivers of Yukon–Koyukuk Census Area, Alaska
Brooks Range
Tributaries of the Yukon River
Rivers of Unorganized Borough, Alaska
Wild and Scenic Rivers of the United States